Warneford Cresswell (5 November 1897 – 20 October 1973) was an English international footballer who was described as "The Prince of Full Backs" for his renowned tackling and positional skills in the right-back position. In a seventeen-year career in the English Football League he made 571 league appearances, and won seven caps for England.

He began his career during World War I, playing in the Scottish Football League with Morton, Heart of Midlothian and Hibernian, before signing with English Second Division club South Shields in 1919. Three years later he moved into the First Division when he was bought by Sunderland for a world-record fee of £5,500. He made 190 league and cup appearances and helped the "Black Cats" to a second-place finish in 1922–23, before moving on to Everton for £7,000 in 1927. He helped the "Toffees" to win the English Football League championship in 1927–28 and 1931–32, the Second Division championship in 1930–31, the FA Cup in 1933, and the FA Community Shield in 1928 and 1932.

He turned to management with Port Vale in May 1936, and moved on to Northampton Town twelve months later. He later managed Dartford. He has also been credited with the quote: "Good goalkeepers never make great saves".

Early and personal life
Warneford Cresswell was born on 5 November 1897 in South Shields, County Durham. He was the third of five children to Warneford and Charlotte; his father was a marine engineer. His brother, Frank, also played for Sunderland as well as clubs including West Bromwich Albion, Chester and Notts County.

He married Grace H.C. Erikson in 1924, with whom he had one daughter, Audrey (born 1925), and one son, Corbett (born 1932). Corbett was in the Bishop Auckland team which won the FA Amateur Cup three years in succession in the 1950s. His great-granddaughter is Lincoln based Olympic swimmer Kate Haywood. After retiring from football, Cresswell went on to manage a pub in the Sunderland area.

Club career

Early career
Cresswell was born in South Shields, Tyne and Wear (then in County Durham). He represented South Shields Schools and England Schools as a youngster, as well as playing junior football locally, although the outbreak of World War I prevented him playing professional football in England, where football was suspended. This was not the case in Scotland, however, where the Scottish Football League continued throughout the hostilities, so the teenage Cresswell moved north of the border to play for Morton, Heart of Midlothian and Hibernian. He also guested for Tottenham Hotspur. He later enlisted in the army, and was captured and held in a prisoner-of-war camp before being repatriated at the end of the war.

South Shields
In the summer of 1919 he signed for South Shields, then playing in the Second Division. He played for the club in 1919–20, their first season in English Football League, when they finished in ninth place. They finished eighth in 1920–21, and sixth in 1921–22, just six points short of promoted Stoke. In all he played 104 league and cup matches for the club.

Sunderland
In 1922, he moved to Sunderland, when manager-secretary Bob Kyle authorised a then-world record fee of £5,500. The record was not broken again until Bob Kelly joined him at Sunderland for £6,500 in December 1925. The "Black Cats" finished as First Division runners-up in 1922–23, six points behind champions Liverpool. They came closer to the title in 1923–24 despite finishing third, as they ended up four points behind champions Huddersfield Town. They then dropped to seventh in 1924–25, before another third-place finish in 1925–26; in the latter campaign they were nine points behind first placed Huddersfield Town. His last full campaign at Roker Park, 1926–27, ended up with Sunderland again in third place, seven points behind rivals Newcastle United. He made a total of 190 appearances for the club in league and cup competitions.

Everton
He moved to Everton in 1927 for £7,000, at the age of 30, where he played alongside goal machine Dixie Dean. He won the league title in 1927–28, his first season at Goodison Park. They then won the subsequent Charity Shield in 1928, before finishing a disappointing 18th in 1928–29, just three places above the drop. Everton then finished bottom of the division in 1929–30, though were just one point behind third-from-bottom (and therefore not relegated) Sheffield United. The "Toffees" made an immediate return to the top-flight, marching to the Second Division title in 1930–31, seven points ahead of runners-up West Bromwich Albion; they scored 121 goals in their 42 league games. They continued their success into the First Division, winning the title in 1931–32 after finishing two points ahead of Arsenal. Their success continued in the Charity Shield in 1932, as they beat Newcastle United 5–3 at St James' Park. They dropped to eleventh in 1932–33, but lifted the FA Cup in 1933. The final, held in front of 92,950 spectators at Wembley, finished in a 3–0 victory over Manchester City, and the Manchester Guardian described Cresswell as giving "an almost perfect display". The club's final two seasons under manager-secretary Thomas H. McIntosh ended with a whimper however, with a 14th-place finish in 1933–34 and an eighth-place finish in 1934–35. Theo Kelly led Everton to a 16th-place finish in 1935–36, Cresswell's last as a professional footballer. Retiring at the age of 38 having made 306 appearances for the club, after his death he was inaugurated into the Gwladys Street's Hall of Fame.

International career
Cresswell was capped for England seven times. His first match was against Wales on 14 March 1921 and his last was against Ireland on 19 October 1929. His first appearance was whilst still at South Shields, thus making him South Shield's only England international.

Style of play
Cresswell played in the right-back position. He was a renowned tackler and famed for his cool demeanour, fine tackling and masterful positional play. He became hugely popular with fans wherever he played, establishing a reputation as a 'gentleman', both on and off the pitch. He has been described, during his Everton days, as: "A stylish English fullback, who made "modern" runs forward and usually stole the ball from the opposition with skillful rather than crude tackling". One player recounted how his leg was broken following a collision with Cresswell, who appeared later at the hospital with a pouch of smoking tobacco, which at the time was probably considered more manly than flowers or a bag of grapes.

Managerial career

Port Vale
After retiring as a player, Cresswell was appointed manager-coach of Port Vale in May 1936. He introduced strict training methods to the club, the emphasis being on fitness, using activities such as running and gymnastics. These were combined with relaxed sessions of snooker and billiards. The "Valiants" were in the Third Division North, and had spent the majority of the 1935–36 season without a manager. He signed winger Gerry Kelly from Chester; right-half Tommy Ward from Grimsby Town; and left-half Spencer Evans from Altrincham. He also traded George Stabb to Bradford Park Avenue for Tom Nolan. Results began poorly, and so Cresswell signed inside-forward Alfred Dickinson from Everton. Vale then became hard to beat, and remained undefeated for thirteen matches between 24 October and 2 January, with central player Fred Obrey proving to be a revelation. The team were in fourth place at the turn of the year, however results then tailed off, and Cresswell left the club after the campaign ended with an eleventh-place finish.

Northampton Town
His professional manner seemed to indicate a bright future as manager and in May 1937 he took up the management position at Northampton Town, later being the manager-secretary. He instigated a policy of promoting young players at the County Ground; this came at the expense of established players such as striker Jack Haycox, who was transfer-listed at an asking price of £250. Under his stewardship the "Cobblers" finished ninth in the Third Division South in 1937–38 and seventeenth in 1938–39. In 1947, he was on a short-list of 10 for the post of manager at Newcastle United. Instead he took up the position at Dartford, resigning after a poor run of results.

Career statistics

Club statistics
Source:

International

Managerial
Source:

Honours
Professionals
FA Charity Shield: 1923

Everton
FA Charity Shield: 1928 & 1932
Football League First Division: 1927–28 & 1931–32
Football League Second Division: 1930–31
FA Cup: 1933

England
British Home Championship 1926–27 (shared), 1929–30

References

External links
 
 
 
 England profile

1897 births
1973 deaths
Footballers from South Shields
English footballers
England schools international footballers
England international footballers
Association football fullbacks
Greenock Morton F.C. players
Heart of Midlothian F.C. players
Hibernian F.C. players
South Shields F.C. (1889) players
Tottenham Hotspur F.C. wartime guest players
Sunderland A.F.C. players
Everton F.C. players
Scottish Football League players
English Football League players
English Football League representative players
English football managers
Port Vale F.C. managers
Northampton Town F.C. managers
Dartford F.C. managers
English Football League managers
FA Cup Final players
British Army personnel of World War I
British World War I prisoners of war